São Vicente may refer to:

Africa
 São Vicente, Cape Verde, an island in Cape Verde
 São Vicente, Guinea-Bissau, a village in Guinea-Bissau

Brazil
 São Vicente, São Paulo, the first permanent Portuguese settlement in the Americas 
 São Vicente Island (São Paulo, Brazil), island in the São Paulo state
 São Vicente, Rio Grande do Norte
 São Vicente Ferrer, Pernambuco
 São Vicente Ferrer, Maranhão
 São Vicente de Minas, Minas Gerais
 São Vicente do Sul, Rio Grande do Sul

Portugal
 São Vicente (Abrantes), a parish in the municipality of Abrantes
 São Vicente (Braga), a parish in the municipality of Braga
 São Vicente (Lisbon), a civil parish
 São Vicente Ferreira, a parish in the municipality of Ponta Delgada
 São Vicente, Madeira, a parish and a municipality in Madeira
 Cabo de São Vicente, Cape St. Vincent
 Monastery of São Vicente de Fora, a church and royal mausoleum in Lisbon
 , a parish in the municipality of Chaves
 , a parish in the municipality of Guarda

See also
 Saint Vincent (disambiguation)
 San Vicente (disambiguation)